Just Like Brothers (original title: Comme des frères) is a 2012 French comedy film written, directed and produced by Hugo Gélin.

Plot 
Since Charlie (Melanie Thierry) died, Boris (François-Xavier Demaison), a businessman, Elie (Nicolas Duvauchelle), a renowned scriptwriter, and Maxime (Pierre Niney), a naive 20-year-old boy, lost the woman of their lives. These characters with opposite personalities find themselves involved in a 900-km long journey to the cherished house of their sister, their friend, their love.

Cast 
 François-Xavier Demaison as Boris
 Nicolas Duvauchelle as Élie
 Pierre Niney as Maxime
 Mélanie Thierry as Charlie
 Lannick Gautry as Vassily
 Philippe Laudenbach as Grandfather
 Florence Thomassin as Line

Production 
At the end of the 2000s, Hugo Gelin planned to make a film but shortly before the shooting started, a distributor withdrew from the project. He then created a production company named Zazi films and started to prepare three movies, including Comme des frères. The story is partly inspired by the friendship between the 30-year-old film director and two of his friends, who are 20 and 40 years old. According to Hugo Gelin, this kind of "unusual friendship" is rarely adapted to the screen.

Comme des frères is dedicated to Jocelyn Quivrin, one of Hugo Gelin's best friends, who died while the film was being written. After this event, Hugo Gelin decided to make this film a comedy.

The amusement park scene was shot in September 2011 in Nigloland in the French departement of Aube. The park is renamed "Fifouland" in the film. Amongst others, scenes were shot in Corsica, in Provence, in Paris or even in Germany.

Music 
The original soundtrack of the film is almost exclusively composed of songs from the band Revolver, written or re-recorded for the film. Three of the twenty-four tracks don't belong to the French band: Shame Shame Shame by The Khaliq Group, The Days We Won’t Spend by Thomas Darmon and Nothing From Nothing by Billy Preston. The album was released in November 2012, 12th led by the single Parallel Lives.

Release 

Before Comme des frères was released, the film's team promoted it between August and November 2012 in many festivals such as Lama (Corsica), Angoulême, Paris (Telerama Festival), Colmar, Montpellier, Reunion, Sarlat, and also premieres with Hugo Gelin and the three main characters as special guests occurred throughout France.

Critical response 
The film received positive reviews from the written press. For Jean-Pierre Lacomme from Le Journal du Dimanche, this is a "beautiful road-movie". According to Paris Match, "the juvenile energy and the sincerity [of the movie] should involve even the more sceptical viewer". In Elle, Khadija Moussou talks about the "cinematographic surprise of the season."

The press particularly praised the actors. According to Jean-Pierre Lacomme, the "three comedians work well together". Paris Match talks about a "quartet of four comedians in a dainty harmony". For Khadija Moussou, "thanks to the clever and successful dialogues, these three are doing brilliantly". For Vincent Julé from the Parisien, "the alchemy between the three comedians is undeniable". He grants a special mention for Nicolas Duvauchelle, "incredibly natural". Others proved to be more touched by the "tormented Melanie Thierry", "radiant" in the eye of Jean-Philippe Guerand from Nouvel Obs. For him, François Xavier Demaison has hardly ever been "so sober and touching". For Guillemette Odicio from Télérama, the actor is "still as effective". Most of the critics pay tribute to Pierre Niney's performance, even amounting to talk about a "real discovery" or a "revelation".

Accolades

References

External links 
 

2012 films
2012 comedy films
2010s French-language films
French comedy films
2012 directorial debut films
Films directed by Hugo Gélin
2010s French films